Merrylands was an electoral district for the Legislative Assembly in the Australian state of New South Wales, named after and including the Sydney suburb of Merrylands. It was first created in 1959 and abolished in 1962. It was recreated in 1968 and abolished in 1988.

Members for Merrylands

Election results

References

Former electoral districts of New South Wales

Constituencies established in 1959
1959 establishments in Australia

Constituencies disestablished in 1962
1962 disestablishments in Australia

Constituencies established in 1968
1968 establishments in Australia

Constituencies disestablished in 1988
1988 disestablishments in Australia